The PNS Iqbal (also known as Naval Base Iqbal ) is the naval base that serves as the training and operating headquarters of the Navy Special Service Group, having been established in 1966 at the Karachi coast in Sindh in Pakistan.

Besides serving as the headquarter of the Navy Special Service Group, the PNS Iqbal is a submarine base for the Cosmos-class submarine, and served as a submarine base since its establishment in 1968. 

In 1991, the PNS Iqbal served as the operation base for the Pakistan Marines when the 1st Marines Battalion was established before the Marines were relocated at Qasim Fort located in the Qasim Marines Base in Karachi coast.

References

External links

Iqbal
Iqbal
Military installations in Sindh
Pakistan Navy submarine bases